William James Durant (November 5, 1885 – November 7, 1981) was an American writer, historian, and philosopher. He became best known for his work, The Story of Civilization, which contains 11 volumes and details the history of eastern and western civilizations. It was written in collaboration with his wife, Ariel Durant, and published between 1935 and 1975. He was earlier noted for The Story of Philosophy (1926), described as "a groundbreaking work that helped to popularize philosophy".

Durant conceived of philosophy as total perspective or seeing things sub specie totius (i.e., "from the perspective of the whole")—a phrase inspired by Spinoza's sub specie aeternitatis, roughly meaning "from the perspective of the eternal". He sought to unify and humanize the great body of historical knowledge, which had grown voluminous and become fragmented into esoteric specialties, and to vitalize it for contemporary application. As a result of their success, he and his wife were jointly awarded the Pulitzer Prize for General Nonfiction in 1968 and the Presidential Medal of Freedom in 1977.

Early life
William James Durant was born in North Adams, Massachusetts, to French-Canadian Catholic parents, Joseph Durant and Mary Allard, who had been part of the Quebec emigration to the United States.

After graduating from St. Peter's Preparatory School in Jersey City, New Jersey, in 1903, Durant enrolled at Saint Peter's College, now Saint Peter's University, also in Jersey City. Historian Joan Rubin writes of that period, "Despite some adolescent flirtations, he began preparing for the vocation that promised to realize his mother's fondest hopes for him: the priesthood. In that way, one might argue, he embarked on a course that, while distant from Yale's or Columbia's apprenticeships in gentility, offered equivalent cultural authority within his own milieu."

In 1905, he began experimenting with socialist philosophy, but, after World War I, he began recognizing that a "lust for power" underlay all forms of political behavior. However, even before the war, "other aspects of his sensibility had competed with his radical leanings," notes Rubin. She adds that "the most concrete of those was a persistent penchant for philosophy. With his energy invested in Baruch Spinoza, he made little room for the Russian anarchist Mikhail Bakunin. From then on, writes Rubin, "his retention of a model of selfhood predicated on discipline made him unsympathetic to anarchist injunctions to 'be yourself.'... To be one's 'deliberate self,' he explained, meant to 'rise above' the impulse to 'become the slaves of our passions' and instead to act with 'courageous devotion' to a moral cause." Durant graduated from Saint Peter's College in 1907.

Teaching career

From 1907 to 1911, Durant taught Latin and French at Seton Hall University in South Orange, New Jersey.

After leaving Seton Hall, Durant was a teacher at Ferrer Modern School from 1911 to 1913. Ferrer was "an experiment in libertarian education," according to the Who's Who of Pulitzer Prize Winners. Alden Freeman, a supporter of the Ferrer Modern School, sponsored him for a tour of Europe. At the Modern School, he fell in love with and married a 15-year-old pupil, Chaya (Ida) Kaufman, whom he later nicknamed "Ariel". The Durants had one daughter, Ethel, and a "foster" son, Louis, whose mother was Flora—Ariel's sister.

By 1914, he began to reject "intimations of human evil," notes Rubin, and to "retreat from radical social change." She summarizes the changes in his overall philosophy:

In 1913, he resigned his post as teacher and married Ariel Kaufman; they had two children, Ethel and Louis. To support themselves, he began lecturing in a Presbyterian church for $5 and $10; the material for the lectures became the starting point for The Story of Civilization.

Durant was director and lecturer at the Labor Temple School in New York City from 1914 to 1927 while pursuing a PhD at Columbia University that he completed in 1917, the year he also served as an instructor in philosophy.

Writing career
In 1908, Durant worked as a reporter for Arthur Brisbane's New York Evening Journal. At the Evening Journal, he wrote several articles on sexual criminals.

In 1917, while working on a doctorate in philosophy at Columbia University, he wrote his first book, Philosophy and the Social Problem. He discussed the idea that philosophy had not grown because it had refused to confront the actual problems of society. He received his doctorate from Columbia that same year. He was also an instructor at the university.

The Story of Philosophy
The Story of Philosophy originated as a series of Little Blue Books (educational pamphlets aimed at workers) and because it was so popular, it was republished as a hardcover book by Simon & Schuster in 1926 and became a bestseller, giving the Durants the financial independence that allowed them to travel the world several times and spend four decades writing The Story of Civilization. Will left teaching and began work on the 11-volume Story of Civilization.

The Story of Civilization

Throughout their writing of The Story of Civilization, the Durants strove to create what they called "integral history." They opposed the "specialization" of history, an anticipatory rejection of what some have called the "cult of the expert." Their goal was to write a "biography" of a civilization, in this case, the history of the West. Not only would it describe the usual history of the Western world's wars, the history of politics and biographies of people of greatness and villainy, but also the history of the Western world's culture, art, philosophy, religion, and the rise of mass communication. Much of The Story considers the living conditions of everyday people throughout the 2500-year period that their "story" of the West covers. These volumes also bring an unabashedly moral framework to their accounts, constantly stressing the "dominance of the strong over the weak, the dominance of the clever over the simple." The Story of Civilization is the most successful historiographical series in history. In the 1990s, an unabridged audiobook production of all 11 volumes was produced by Books On Tape and it was read by Alexander Adams (Grover Gardner).

For Rousseau and Revolution (1967), the 10th volume of The Story of Civilization, the Durants were awarded the Pulitzer Prize for literature. In 1977, it was followed by one of the two highest awards which was ever granted to civilians by the United States government, the Presidential Medal of Freedom, awarded by Gerald Ford. The Durants received the Golden Plate Award of the American Academy of Achievement in 1976.

The first volume of The Story of Civilization series, titled Our Oriental Heritage (1935), is divided into an introduction and three books. The introduction takes the reader through the different aspects of civilization (economical, political, moral and mental). Book One is dedicated to the civilizations of the Near East (Sumeria, Egypt, Babylonia, Assyria, Judea and Persia). Book two is titled "India and Her Neighbors." Book three moves deeper into the east, where the Chinese Civilization flourishes and Japan starts to find its place on the world's political map.

Other works

On April 8, 1944, while on holiday with some intimate friends in Carboneras, Spain, Durant was approached by two leaders of the Jewish and Christian faiths, Meyer David and Christian Richard about starting "a movement, to raise moral standards." He suggested instead that they start a movement against racial intolerance and outlined his ideas for a "Declaration of Interdependence". The movement for the declaration, Declaration of INTERdependence, Inc., was launched at a gala dinner at the Hollywood Roosevelt Hotel on March 22, 1945, attended by over 400 people including Thomas Mann and Bette Davis. The Declaration was read into the Congressional Record on October 1, 1945, by Ellis E. Patterson.

Throughout his career, Durant made several speeches, including "Persia in the History of Civilization", which was presented as an address before the Iran-America Society in Tehran, Iran, on April 21, 1948, and it had been intended for inclusion in the Bulletin of the Asia Institute (formerly, the Bulletin of the American Institute for Persian, then Iranian, Art and Archaeology), Vol. VII, no. 2, which never saw publication.

Rousseau and Revolution was followed by a slender volume of observations which was titled The Lessons of History, which was both a synopsis of the series as well as an analysis of human history.

Though Ariel and Will had intended to carry the work on The Story of Civilization into the 20th century, at their now very advanced age, they expected the 10th volume to be their last. However, they went on to publish a final volume, their 11th, The Age of Napoleon in 1975. They also left notes for a 12th volume behind, The Age of Darwin, as well as an outline of a 13th volume, The Age of Einstein, which would have taken The Story of Civilization to 1945.

Three posthumous works by Durant have been published in recent years, The Greatest Minds and Ideas of All Time (2002), Heroes of History: A Brief History of Civilization from Ancient Times to the Dawn of the Modern Age (2001) and Fallen Leaves (2014).

Final years
The Durants shared an intense love for one another as they explained in their Dual Autobiography.  After Will entered the hospital, Ariel stopped eating, and she died on October 25, 1981. Though their daughter, Ethel, and their grandchildren strove to conceal the news of Ariel's death from the ailing Will, he found out that she had died while he was watching the evening news, and he died two weeks later, two days after his 96th birthday, on November 7, 1981. Will was buried beside Ariel in the Westwood Village Memorial Park Cemetery, in Los Angeles.

Writing about Russia
In 1933, he published Tragedy of Russia: Impressions from a Brief Visit and soon afterward, he published The Lesson of Russia.  A few years after the books were published, the social commentator Will Rogers read them and he described a symposium which he had attended which included Durant as one of the contributors to it. He later wrote of Durant, "He is just about our best writer on Russia. He is the most fearless writer that has been there. He tells you just what it's like. He makes a mighty fine talk. One of the most interesting lecturers we have, and a fine fellow."

Writing about India

In 1930, Durant visited British India to collect information for The Story of Civilization. While in India, Durant was shocked by the poverty and instances of starvation he witnessed, to the point where he took a period of time off from his intended goal to write a short book titled The Case for India about the "conscious and deliberate bleeding of India" by Britain. In The Case for India, Durant wrote that "The British conquest of India was the invasion and destruction of a high civilization by a trading company utterly without scruple or principle, careless of art and greedy of gain, over-running with fire and sword a country temporarily disordered and helpless, bribing and murdering, annexing and stealing, and beginning their career of illegal and 'legal' plunder which has now gone on ruthlessly for one hundred and seventy-three years."

Reception and legacy
Durant fought for equal wages, women's suffrage and fairer working conditions for the American labor force. Not only did Durant write about many topics, he also put his ideas into effect.

He worked to improve the understanding of viewpoints between people and tried to convince other to forgive human beings for their failings and waywardness. He chided the comfortable insularity of what is now known as Eurocentrism by pointing out in Our Oriental Heritage that Europe was only "a jagged promontory of Asia". He complained about "the provincialism of our traditional histories which began with Greece and summed up Asia in a line" and said they showed "a possibly fatal error of perspective and intelligence".

On the decline and rebuilding of civilizations
Much like Oswald Spengler, he saw the decline of a civilization as the culmination of strife between religion and secular intellectualism, thus toppling the precarious institutions of convention and morality:

     
More than twenty years after his death, a quote from Durant, "A great civilization is not conquered from without until it has destroyed itself from within" appeared as the opening graphic of Mel Gibson's 2006 film Apocalypto. Durant also served as the history consultant for Anthony Mann's 1964 film The Fall of the Roman Empire. The narration at the beginning and the end of the film is taken almost directly from Durant's work Caesar and Christ.

On science and the Bible
In an article in 1927, he wrote his thoughts about reconciling the Bible and evolution:

In 1967 Durant wrote:

On history and the Bible
In Our Oriental Heritage, Durant wrote:

Selected books
See a full bibliography at Will Durant Online
 1917: Philosophy and the Social Problem New York: Macmillan.
 1924: A Guide to Spinoza [Little Blue Book, No. 520]. Girard, KA: Haldeman-Julius Company.
 1926: The Story of Philosophy. New York: Simon & Schuster.
 1927: Transition. New York: Simon & Schuster.
 1929: The Mansions of Philosophy. New York: Simon & Schuster. Later with slight revisions re-published as The Pleasures of Philosophy
 1930: The Case for India. New York: Simon & Schuster.
 1931: A Program for America: New York: Simon & Schuster.
 1931: Adventures in Genius. New York: Simon & Schuster.
 1931: Great Men of Literature, taken from Adventures in Genius. New York: Garden City Publishing Co.
 1933: The Tragedy of Russia: Impressions From a Brief Visit. New York: Simon & Schuster.
 1936: The Foundations of Civilisation. New York: Simon & Schuster.
 1953: The Pleasures of Philosophy. New York: Simon & Schuster.
 1968: (with Ariel Durant) The Lessons of History. New York: Simon & Schuster.
 1970: (with Ariel Durant) Interpretations of Life. New York: Simon & Schuster.
 1977: (with Ariel Durant) A Dual Autobiography. New York: Simon & Schuster.
 2001: Heroes of History: A Brief History of Civilization from Ancient Times to the Dawn of the Modern Age. New York: Simon & Schuster. Actually copyrighted by John Little and the Estate of Will Durant.
 2002: The Greatest Minds and Ideas of All Time. New York: Simon & Schuster.
 2003: An Invitation to Philosophy: Essays and Talks on the Love of Wisdom. Promethean Press.
 2008: Adventures in Philosophy. Promethean Press.
 2014: Fallen Leaves. Simon & Schuster.

The Story of Civilization
 1935: Our Oriental Heritage. New York: Simon & Schuster.
 1939: The Life of Greece. New York: Simon & Schuster.
 1944: Caesar and Christ. New York: Simon & Schuster.
 1950: The Age of Faith. New York: Simon & Schuster.
 1953: The Renaissance. New York: Simon & Schuster.
 1957: The Reformation. New York: Simon & Schuster.
 1961: (with Ariel Durant) The Age of Reason Begins. New York: Simon & Schuster.
 1963: (with Ariel Durant) The Age of Louis XIV. New York: Simon & Schuster.
 1965: (with Ariel Durant) The Age of Voltaire. New York: Simon & Schuster.
 1967: (with Ariel Durant) Rousseau and Revolution. New York: Simon & Schuster.
 1975: (with Ariel Durant) The Age of Napoleon. New York: Simon & Schuster.

Notes

References

External links 

 The Will Durant Timeline Project
 The Pulitzer Prizes: 1968
 "Durant, Will and Durant, Ariel." Encyclopædia Britannica Premium Service (Accessed May 14, 2005)
 
 
 
 , preserved at the Internet Archive
 Will Durant's list of One Hundred Best Books for an Education
 Links to Each of Will Durant's 100 Best Books for an Education
 
 

1885 births
1981 deaths
20th-century American male writers
20th-century American non-fiction writers
20th-century American philosophers
American educators
American historians of philosophy
American male essayists
American male non-fiction writers
American people of French-Canadian descent
Burials at Westwood Village Memorial Park Cemetery
Columbia University alumni
Ferrer Center and Colony
Historians from Massachusetts
People from North Adams, Massachusetts
Philosophers of history
Philosophy academics
Philosophy writers
Presidential Medal of Freedom recipients
Pulitzer Prize for General Non-Fiction winners
Saint Peter's University alumni
St. Peter's Preparatory School alumni
Theorists on Western civilization
 
World historians
Members of the American Academy of Arts and Letters